The first Africans in Virginia were a group of "twenty and odd" captive enslaved persons originally from modern-day Angola who landed at Old Point Comfort in Hampton, Virginia in late August 1619, whose arrival is seen as a beginning of the history of slavery in Virginia and British colonies in North America, which would go on to secede and become the United States in 1776, also as a starting point for African-American history, given that they were the first such group in mainland British America.

They were sold to the governor of Virginia by "Capt Jope", the commander of The White Lion, who attacked and plundered them from the slave ship São João Bautista, which was carrying over three hundred enslaved people who had been kidnapped from the Kingdom of Ndongo and were being forcibly sailed to New Spain (modern-day Mexico). Recognition of this event has been promoted since 1994 by Calvin Pearson and "Project 1619 Inc", an organization he founded in 2007, whose work led the Virginia Department of Historic Resources to install a historic marker commemorating this event at Old Point Comfort in 2007 and the designation of this area as the Fort Monroe National Monument in 2011.

Several commemorations of this event took place on its 400th anniversary in August 2019, including the starting of The 1619 Project (not associated with Project 1619, Inc.) with a publication by Nikole Hannah-Jones commemorating this event and the Year of Return, Ghana 2019 to encourage the African diaspora to settle in and invest in Africa.

From Angola to Mexico 
During the Atlantic slave trade, starting in the 16th century, Portuguese slave traders brought large numbers of African people across the Atlantic to work in their colonies in the Americas, such as Brazil. An estimated 4.9 million people from Africa were brought to Brazil during the period from 1501 to 1866. Thousands of people were captured by Portuguese slave traders and their African allies such as the Imbangala, in invasions of the Kingdom of Ndongo (part of modern Angola) under Governor Luís Mendes de Vasconcellos. These captives were taken to port and often sent to other parts of the Spanish and Portuguese Empires, which were brought together in that time by the Iberian Union. Those taken captive from Angola may have belonged to the Ambundu ethnic group, an interpretation used at the Jamestown Settlement Galleries.

In 1619, the Portuguese fluyt San Juan Bautista took a large group through the Middle Passage from Luanda in Angola to the bay of Veracruz in Mexico. Of the 350 total on the slave ship, about 143 died in the voyage, and 24 children were sold during a stop at the Colony of Santiago in Jamaica, with 123 enslaved people eventually being taken to Veracruz, in addition to the smaller group of 20-30 taken by the privateers, or perhaps double that amount.

From Mexico to Virginia 
Near Veracruz in the Bay of Campeche, the English privateers White Lion and Treasurer, operating under Dutch and Savoyard letters of marque and sponsored by the Earl of Warwick and Samuel Argall, attacked the San Juan Bautista, and each took 20-30 of the African captives to Old Point Comfort on Hampton Roads at the tip of the Virginia Peninsula, the first time such a group was brought to mainland English America. Of those aboard the Treasurer, only a few were sold in Virginia, the majority being taken shortly thereafter to Nathaniel Butler in Bermuda. English privateers had been sailing under Dutch and other flags since the 1604 Treaty of London concluded the Anglo-Spanish War.

The primary source document for the White Lion's arrival is as follows:

One of the enslaved women from the Treasurer was called Angela, who was purchased by Captain William Peirce. She is the earliest historically attested enslaved African in the colony.

Artworks 
Meta Vaux Warrick Fuller included a diorama of the 1619 arrival as part of her commission for the 1907 Jamestown Exposition, the first such granted to an African-American woman artist from the U.S. government. This work is no longer extant.

The 1940 American Negro Exposition included a historical diorama with a similar theme, and was restored in the 21st century. It is part of the collection of the Legacy Museum of Tuskegee University.

Sidney E. King painted a historical scene of the 1619 arrival for the National Park Service in the 1950s.

Commemoration 
Abraham Lincoln in his second inaugural address of 1865 refers to "the bondsman's two hundred and fifty years of unrequited toil", which would be approximately 1615, according to scholar Diana Schaub an allusion to the events of 1619.

The arrival was recognized by George Washington Williams as the starting point for African American history in the first comprehensive book ever written on the topic, the History of the Negro Race in America From 1619 to 1880: Negroes  As  Slaves,  As  Soldiers,  And  As  Citizens, published in 1882.

The 350th anniversary of the arrival was marked in 1969 by a Virginia effort organized by civil rights attorney Oliver Hill, and with featured speaker Samuel DeWitt Proctor; it was however opposed by others including then-freshman state senator and future-Governor Douglas Wilder as an occasion inappropriate for celebration. There was also a commemoration of the 375th anniversary in 1994.

The 400th anniversary in 2019 was marked by the congressionally-chartered "400 Years of African-American History Commission" under the National Park Service, which administers Fort Monroe National Monument. That year also saw The 1619 Project of The New York Times and the Year of Return in Ghana.

See also
 Atlantic Creole
 Coastwise slave trade
 Colonial South and the Chesapeake
 Great Dismal Swamp maroons
 History of slavery in Virginia
 Scramble
 Seasoning
 Slavery in the colonial history of the United States
 William Tucker, the first person of African descent born in the Thirteen British Colonies

References

1619 in the Thirteen Colonies
17th century in Angola
African-American history of Virginia
Angolan-American history
Colony of Virginia
First arrivals in the United States
History of Hampton, Virginia
History of slavery in Virginia
Slavery in the British Empire